Loir en Vallée (literally Loir in Valley) is a commune in the department of Sarthe, northwestern France. The municipality was established on 1 January 2017 by merger of the former communes of Ruillé-sur-Loir (the seat), La Chapelle-Gaugain, Lavenay and Poncé-sur-le-Loir.

See also 
Communes of the Sarthe department

References 

Communes of Sarthe